Pieter "Piet" Keur (born 20 December 1960 in Zandvoort, North Holland) is a retired football striker from the Netherlands, who was a prolific goalscorer in the 1980s and early 1990s. He's currently striker-coach at AZ.

He played for HFC Haarlem (1981–87), FC Twente (1987–89), Feyenoord Rotterdam (1989–90), SVV (1991), HFC Haarlem (1991–93), SC Heerenveen (1993–94) and AZ Alkmaar (1995–96). He retired in 1996, playing for the club where he started his career, HFC Haarlem. Keur was a member of the famous Haarlem-team, that competed in the UEFA Cup in the 1982–83 season, for the first time in the club's history.

References

  Profile

1960 births
Living people
People from Zandvoort
Dutch footballers
Association football forwards
Feyenoord players
HFC Haarlem players
SV SVV players
FC Twente players
AZ Alkmaar players
SC Heerenveen players
Eredivisie players
Eerste Divisie players
AZ Alkmaar non-playing staff
Footballers from North Holland